Daniuska Isamar Rodríguez Pineda (born 4 January 1999) is a Venezuelan footballer who plays as a midfielder for Portuguese club SCU Torreense and the Venezuela women's national team. She ranked third in the FIFA Puskas Award 2016.

International career
Rodríguez represented Venezuela at the 2014 South American U-20 Women's Championship.

References

External links 
 
 Profile at S.C. Braga 

1999 births
Living people
People from Ciudad Ojeda
Venezuelan women's footballers
Women's association football midfielders
S.C. Braga (women's football) players
Campeonato Nacional de Futebol Feminino players
Venezuela women's international footballers
Competitors at the 2014 Central American and Caribbean Games
Venezuelan expatriate women's footballers
Venezuelan expatriate sportspeople in Ecuador
Expatriate women's footballers in Ecuador
Venezuelan expatriate sportspeople in Portugal
Expatriate women's footballers in Portugal